Menri Monastery ( — "medicine mountain") is the name of a Bon monastery in Tibet that has been refounded in India. The name derives from the medicinal plants and medicinal springs on the mountain. Menri became the leading Bon monastery in the Tibetan cultural region. The abbot of Menri is recognized as the spiritual leader of Bon.

History 
Menri Monastery was established in 1405 by Nyammé Shérap Gyeltsen (1356–1416) from Gyarong (Gyelrong), on the slope of Mount Shari Phowa in Topgyel, Tsang.

Nyammé Shérap Gyeltsen had been the eighteenth abbot of an old monastery also called Menri. The first monastery at Menri was founded in 1072 as Yéru Wensakha Monastery. It was destroyed by a flood in 1386.

The new Menri Monastery, established in 1405, was founded in the Bru lineage of Bon and the Yéru Wensakha tradition. "Many of the monks who succeeded [Nyammé Shérap Gyeltsen] were also from Gyarong." The monastery practiced  Yungdrung Bon, and was known "for its strict practice of monastic rules, which set a standard for other Bon monasteries." Rinchen Gyeltsen was the second abbot.

The monastery had 32 abbots between its founding and 1966. The administration of the monastery is the subject of an article by Per Kvaerne.

Sanggye Tendzin (1912-1978) served as lopön at Menri, and "was also in charge of printing important works of Dzogchen."

The administration of the monastery is the subject of an article by Per Kvaerne.

Menri Monastery in India 

In 1967, Menri was refounded at Dolanji in Himachal Pradesh, India by Lungtok Tenpai Nyima and Lopön Tenzin Namdak. This monastery has recreated the geshe training program, and is home to over two hundred monks. Menri in India and Triten Norbutse Monastery in Nepal now host the only two geshe programs in the Bon lineage.

See also
Lopön Tenzin Namdak
Lungtok Tenpai Nyima

References

External links
 Alexander Berzin, 1991, expanded September 2003. Original version published in "Bön Monasteries." Chö-Yang, Year of Tibet Edition (Dharamsala, India), (1991)
 The Bon Foundation
 Menri Monastery Protected Area Permit
 Menri, Tibetan Monastery Inventory
 Menri Monastery Photos and Video, Bill Megalos

1405 establishments in Asia
Religious organizations established in the 15th century
Bon
Monasteries in India